Calippus is a small lunar impact crater that is located on the eastern edge of the rugged Montes Caucasus mountain range in the northern part of the Moon. It was named after Greek astronomer Callippus of Cyzicus. It lies to the southwest of the crater remnant Alexander, to the northwest of the Mare Serenitatis.

The outer rim of Calippus has an irregular appearance, with outward bulges to the northeast and particularly to the west where there is an interior shelf of slumped material. The exterior has a slight rampart that is surrounded by the rugged terrain of the mountain range. Within the sharp-sided interior walls is a rough and irregular interior floor.

To the southeast of this crater, on the edge of the Mare Serenitatis, is an arcing rille designated Rima Calippus. This cleft follows a path to the northeast for a length of about 40 kilometers.

Satellite craters

By convention these features are identified on lunar maps by placing the letter on the side of the crater midpoint that is closest to Calippus.

References

 
 
 
 
 
 
 
 
 
 
 

Impact craters on the Moon